University College, popularly referred to as UC, is a constituent college of the University of Toronto, created in 1853 specifically as an institution of higher learning free of religious affiliation. It was the founding member of the university's modern collegiate system, and its non-denominationalism contrasted with contemporary colleges at the time, such as Trinity College and St. Michael's College, both of which later became part of the University of Toronto.

University College is one of two places in the University of Toronto that has been designated a National Historic Site of Canada, along with Annesley Hall of Victoria College. It is home to the oldest student government in Canada, the Literary and Athletic Society.

History 

Shortly after taking power in the first responsible government of the Province of Canada, Reformist politicians led by Robert Baldwin wrested control of King's College from the Church of England in 1849 and renamed it the University of Toronto. Baldwin envisioned that denominational colleges would soon decide to affiliate themselves under the secular University of Toronto "with some vague status, perhaps as divinity halls". His hopes were dashed when the Presbyterian Queen's College in Kingston opted to stay independent. Baldwin resigned as premier in 1851, leaving his successor, Francis Hincks, to find another way to persuade the denominational colleges. Hincks decided that the university should adopt the collegiate university governance model, used for centuries at Oxbridge and more recently at the University of London.

On 22 April 1853, University College was created as the Provincial College, and it retains that designation in the current University of Toronto Act. It was the first constituent college of the University of Toronto, inheriting the teaching functions and resources of the former King's College, while the university itself became an examination body. Frederick William Cumberland was appointed in 1856 as the university architect to design and oversee the construction of the college's new building, completed in 1859. Until Wycliffe College joined the university in 1889, University College was the only member college within the University of Toronto, and therefore the principal of the college was also the de facto chief of the entire university. The following year, Knox College and Victoria College also joined the University of Toronto.

University College was severely damaged by a fire that gutted the entire eastern wing and the college library on 14 February 1890. The fire spread rapidly when servants accidentally dropped two kerosene lamps on a wooden staircase at around 7 p.m. while preparing the illumination for an annual college exhibition. In Ottawa, Edward Blake, the university's chancellor and a Member of Parliament, interrupted his speech to inform the House of Commons, "The great institution, the crown and glory, I may be permitted to say, of the educational institutions in our country is at the moment in flames ... and is now, so far as its material fabric goes, a ruin tottering to the ground." Only about 100 books were rescued before the fire consumed more than 33,000 volumes at the college library. Despite the initial fears, University College recovered from the fire with remarkable ease and speed. Wycliffe College and Knox College both offered space for classes to accommodate displaced students. The board of trustees commissioned a swift restoration of the structure with insurance compensations and additional investments. Within two years, the library was replenished with donations from institutions throughout the British Empire.

On 15 February 1895, more than seven hundred University College students attended what was then described as the "largest mass meeting in the history of the University" to discuss the government's dismissal of William Dale, the popular professor of Latin at the college. William Lyon Mackenzie King, a senior undergraduate who would later become Prime Minister of Canada, introduced a successful motion at the meeting to "abstain from attendance at lectures at University College until a proper investigation be granted by the provincial government into the difficulties existing at the university." During the boycott of classes, professor of history George MacKinnon Wrong wrote to Chancellor Blake in England that only one student turned up at one of his lectures. The strike continued until 20 February, when students voted to return to classes after the government agreed to call a commission of inquiry.

In 1968, University College was designated a National Historic Site, in recognition of its historical role in creating the collegiate system at the University of Toronto, and as one of the earliest examples of the collegiate model at universities in the Commonwealth.

Grounds and architecture 

The main building of University College was built between 1856 and 1859, designed by architects Frederick William Cumberland and William George Storm. The selection of architectural styles was the result of "a tangle of disagreements and concessions, political as well as artistic", including the college's emphasis on freedom from denominational control. Cumberland met the requirements asked of him after taking part on a research and experience based trip to Europe in February 1856: "This course of action was consistent with Victorian architectural practice when new public buildings were being planned, which was to carefully study applicable building forms and adapt them, to the requirements of the job at hand. The design committee led by Cumberland initially designed a Gothic structure, but Governor General Edmund Walker Head disliked the style and suggested Italian instead, later changing his preference to Byzantine.

The design committee would eventually include Norman, Romanesque Revival, and "faint traces of Byzantium and the Italian palazzo" styles in the design. In particular, the Byzantine, Norman and early English styles were deemed "fitting for educational institutions". Cumberland chose Norman Romanesque as the main influence because he thought it was the most appreciate for the topography in Canada. To achieve a picturesque approach, Cumberland ignored the classical symmetry and deliberately gave an asymmetrical architectural expression. The building was an unconventional combination of varied parts incorporating British design for educational structures in England and Ireland.

Like most Romanesque buildings, University College has extremely thick masonry walls, built of many types of brick and stone layered upon each other. The main materials include wood, stone, brick, slate, iron, mortar, and tile. Only about one third of the exterior is stone, with the rest being a very pale yellow brick produced at a brickyard on Yonge Street. University College has the characteristic arched and rounded windows as well as huge, cavernous facades. A major feature of University College is arches laid out in series and sets. The arches are semicircular, and consist of small columns that provide the structural support to hold up vaults on the side of walkways. There is much ornamentation, especially in the form of stone carvings, liberally applied on the walls, arches, columns and façades of the building. Carved images include nature, animals, mysterious creatures as well as the college shield and motto. The building also features several stained glass windows, including the rose window by Robert McCausland.

Some of the basic original layout plans remain at University College today. The focal point of the structure is at the south façade, where the stone tower at the centre of the composition contains the main entrance of the college. The quadrangle and cloisters are enclosed within elaborately carved walls faced with stone, "felicitously sited amid landscaped grounds". Until the Laidlaw Wing was completed in the 1960s, University College was a U-shaped structure that was open on the north end.  Before the fire of 1890, the building was laid out such that the east wing provided access to the convocation hall, the museum and the library, and contained an entrance to the quadrangle. Residences and dining halls, classrooms, and public reading rooms were on the west range of the structure. The chemistry laboratory was relocated at the southwest range, in the present Croft Chapter House, because it was more logical than in the first study which was in the north. Today, the west wing is no longer used as living quarters, which are now provided by the college's three dedicated residential halls, while the convocation functions have long since been moved to Convocation Hall.

Revitalization 
The historic University College building is currently undergoing a major revitalization, which will return the College library to its original location at the front of the building. The revitalization began in January 2018 and will improve the accessibility of the building once complete. Important highlights of the revitalization include the relocation of the library to the East Hall, a new reading room in the West Hall, a conference centre in Croft Chapter House, and a cafe located on the third floor of the building.

Academics 

The University College Council is the college's governing body, overseeing administrative, budgetary and academic matters. The principal, in addition to chairing the College Council, serves as the chief executive of the college. Student are represented on the College Council by the leaders of the Literary and Athletic Society and eight additional students.

University College houses several academic programs within the University of Toronto, further varied by major, minor and specialist concentrations, including Canadian studies, cognitive science, drama, health studies, and sexual diversity studies. The college houses a number of visiting fellows who take residence and office at the college.

University College hosts five sets of annual public lecture series. The Alexander Lectures, founded in 1928 and named for English professor W.J. Alexander, focuses on literature over four successive lectures. The Graham Lectures, established in 1930, explores scientific topics from astronomy to zoology in a non-technical manner. The F.E.L. Priestley Memorial Lectures in the History of Ideas are interdisciplinary, encompassing topics in social science and humanities such as literature, economics, history, geography, philosophy, theology, science, political science, as well as applied fields such as business, law, and medicine. The Stubbs Lecture, founded in 1988, focuses on Greek, Latin, or English literature. The Teetzel Lectures concentrates on art and architecture over three successive days.

The Laidlaw Library is the main library of University College. Although the college had a general-interest library before the fire of 1890, the modern Laidlaw Library is specialized in subjects related to the college's in-house academic programs in the humanities and social sciences. It comprises a main collection of 35,000 volumes and secondary collections in literature and poetry.

Student life and traditions

Legend of Diabolos and Reznikoff
The famous ghost story of the University College, started from the carving "Crocodiles and vermin". The sculptor was a Russian, named Ivan Reznikoff. It is said that he was buried in the northeast corner of the quadrangle. Since then, his ghost has been seen at regular intervals.
The newel in the east staircase is a wooden Griffin. The griffin is a magical creature that is a mix of a lion and an eagle. Some students believe that touching the Griffin will bring good luck, such as passing their exams with great marks.

Diabolos' is University College's not-for-profit coffee bar that has been overseen by the Lit and student-run since 1966. It provides fair trade coffee, tea, vegan and vegetarian products to University College students. It is located in University College's Junior Common Room and is open Monday to Thurs 8:30am – 6pm and Friday 8:30am – 4pm.

Literary and Athletic Society

The University College Literary and Athletic Society, colloquially known as the 'Lit', is the oldest student government in Canada dating back to 1854.  Established in 1854 as the Literary and Scientific Society and renamed The University College Literary and Athletic Society in 1921 it merged with the University College Women's Undergraduate Association in 1958 to become representative of all students attending the college.

Every student of University College is a member of the society. The Lit's mandate is to provide services, host events, facilitate student involvement, represent the student body, and foster a sense of community among students in the college. The Lit is also responsible for the student-run Diabolos' coffee bar, and the annual Fireball formal, commemorating the 1890 fire which destroyed the college. They also provide some support for Orientation Week, a week dedicated to help first-year students transition into university.

The Gargoyle, established in 1954, is the student newspaper of University College, named after the gargoyle statue in the college building. It is staffed by an editorial collective of undergraduate students, as well as a group of staff and regular contributors.

Residential halls

The college's three residence buildings hold about 720 students, and are fully co-ed, although Whitney started out as the women's residence and Sir Daniel Wilson's as the men's. The current Sir Daniel Wilson Hall was built in 1954, and the original Whitney Hall was built in 1931. A third residence, Morrison Hall, was added in 2005. Demand for places is high for a number of reasons: most rooms are singles, the community life is accepting and diverse and most main academic buildings are right across the street. Off-campus students can participate in the residence community life by becoming associate members of one of the houses.

There are a total of fifteen residential divisions, known as "houses", in the residences. There are six houses within the Sir Daniel Wilson Residence: Jeanneret, Taylor, Wallace, Hutton, Loudon, and McCaul. In addition, there are four houses within the Whitney Residence: Cody, Mulock, Falconer, and Ferguson. Finally, there are five houses in Morrison Hall: Landsberg-Lewis, Perron, Wolfe, Bratty, and Langley. Hutton House is named after Maurice Hutton, a University College, University of Toronto classics professor.  He also acted as Principal of University College, University of Toronto from 1901 to 1928.  During 1906 and 1907 he was acting President of the university.

Principals 
In March 2019, Professor Markus Stock was appointed to be the 17th Principal of University College. His term will begin 1 January 2020 and will conclude on 30 June 2024. Stock replaces Donald Ainslie who has served as Principal since 2011.

Notable alumni

References

Further reading
 Douglas S. Richardson. A Not Unsightly Building: University College and Its History. Mosaic Press for University College, 1990.
 Claude T. Bissell. University College: A Portrait.  The University of Toronto Press, 1953.
 Geoffrey Simmins. Fred Cumberland: Building the Victorian Dream. The University of Toronto Press, 1997.
 Martin L. Friedland. The University of Toronto: A History. The University of Toronto Press, 2002.

External links 

 University College
 University College Literary and Athletic Society

Romanesque Revival architecture in Canada
Terminating vistas in Canada
Colleges of the University of Toronto
University of Toronto buildings
Educational institutions established in 1853
National Historic Sites in Ontario
1853 establishments in Canada